NGC 7019 is a spiral galaxy located about 480 million light-years away in the constellation of Capricornus.  It was discovered by American astronomer Francis Leavenworth in 1886.

See also 
 List of NGC objects (7001–7840)

References

External links 

Spiral galaxies
Capricornus (constellation)
7019
66107
Astronomical objects discovered in 1886